Francis Bunney (b Newland 8 May 1543; d Ryton 16 April 1617) was  an English Anglican priest in the 16th century.

Bunney was  educated at Magdalen College, Oxford, of which he became a Fellow in 1661. He became a Canon of Carlisle Cathedral in 1572; Archdeacon of Northumberland in 1574; and Rector of Ryton in 1579, holding all three positions until his death.

Notes

16th-century English Anglican priests
Archdeacons of Northumberland
Alumni of Magdalen College, Oxford
Fellows of Magdalen College, Oxford
1617 deaths
1543 births
Clergy from Yorkshire
People from Selby District